West Coast Killa Beez is the second album that was released by Wu-Tang Clan affiliates Northstar in 2005.

Track listing
"Rise Above Emotions"
"Coming Up, Coming Up"
"Killer Beez" (featuring Warcloud, and Mikey Jarrett, Jr.)
"Sunny" (featuring Lil Diesel)
"Drama" (featuring Concept, Melo, Suave)
"Super Star"
"Tell Mary" (featuring Timbo King)
"I Am"
"Bust Ya Guns" (featuring Warcloud)
"Wanna Bang"
"Break Bread"
"Crazy"
"Up Town, Down Town"

References

2005 albums
Northstar (rap group) albums